The Lola Mk6 GT was a racing car with a production run of only three units, built between 1962 and 1963 by British car manufacturer Lola Cars. With its  Ford V8 engine, the Mk6 GT was the first mid-mounted, high displacement V8-powered Grand Touring car, a chassis arrangement that had been used, up until that time, only  on formula cars and smaller, more affordable GTs.

Development 
Mid-engined cars were a revolutionary idea introduced in motor racing by the Cooper Car Company, a small British firm that managed to beat big players in the Formula 1 World Championship two years in a row. This engine layout did not make its way into Grand Tourers, which were accepted to race only if a minimum production run had been completed: not a single manufacturer was keen on making a big investment to build cars "at a minimum rate of one hundred identical units as far as mechanical parts and coachwork are concerned in 12 consecutive months", as required by the FIA, without having the necessary experience with such applications and the right components.

In those days there was no commonly available transaxle gearbox capable of managing the enormous torque provided by big V8 engines. When the Colotti Tipo 37 gearbox was made available to the market after being specifically built to be mounted on the Lotus 29 single seater, a racing car powered by a  Ford Fairlane V8 and intended to race in the 1963 Indianapolis 500, Lola's owner Eric Broadley had the opportunity to solve the problem.

Moreover, the FIA's decision to terminate its World Sports Car Championship and replace it with the new International Championship for GT Manufacturers for the 1962 season, in order to focus manufacturers' attention on Grand Tourers, made it more difficult for mid-engined GT cars to make their way into production. But the Federation left an open door to research and development, admitting to races Experimental Grand Touring cars (later known as Prototypes), with no minimum production requirement, but requiring roadworthiness. The Lola Mk6 GT was conceived by Eric Broadley at the end of 1962 to be accepted into the Experimental Grand Touring class.

Technical description 
The Mk6 GT featured some of the best technology of the time: first of all an aluminium monocoque (although the prototype car had a steel monocoque in order to save development time), while all opponents, apart from Jaguar, still relied on a space frame chassis. The Ford-Colotti engine-gearbox assembly was a stressed member and the rear suspension was mounted directly on it, a technique that did not appear in full on Formula 1 cars until the Lotus 49 in 1967. As a result the car was so compact that the wheelbase was even shorter than Lola's other formula cars, despite using a large  pushrod V8 engine.

The coachwork, designed by John Frayling and made by FRP, had its own features such as reduced overhangs, Kamm-tail, roof-integrated engine air intake and special doors which extended into the roof to give the drivers greater access to the cockpit once they were open, an idea that was kept on the car's successor, the Ford GT40.

Racing history 
The prototype car (chassis LGT-P, steel monocoque) was shown to the public in January 1963 at the UK Olympia Racing Car Show, making a big success and provoking great expectations, and during the following months South African Tony Maggs raced it at Silverstone (finishing fifth after starting last on the grid) and at the Nürburgring 1000 km (retiring for technical reasons). After Nürburgring, LGT-P was retired.  In 1965, it was sold to Allen Grant for $3,000 and 57 years later, the recently restored LGT-P is still owned by Mr Grant.

While LGT-P was being raced, a second car (chassis LGT-1, aluminium monocoque) was being completed and prepared for the 1963 24 Hours of Le Mans.  
Short of preparation time, Broadley himself brought LGT-1 to Le Mans at the very last moment for technical verification, which required some modifications to the car. After their completion the car was allowed to race, but the time spent couldn't be used for proper testing. The car raced with the wrong gear ratios and so was not able to show all of its potential: drivers didn't use full throttle on the long Mulsanne Straight to avoid overrevving, giving a top speed  lower than predicted, and was forced to retire after 15 hours following an accident due to a gear selector failure. Understanding the potential performance of the Mk6, the Ford Motor Company bought it so as to further test its capabilities, laying the foundation for its GT40 project and involving Broadley himself, although he later left the program.

Meanwhile, a third car was completed, the second aluminium monocoque (chassis LGT-2). It was not raced at Le Mans that year because it was not ready, but was sold to the American Mecom Racing Team who raced it at Brands Hatch, where the Ford engine broke after only four laps. Replaced by a Traco-tuned  Chevrolet V8 delivering  at 6500 rpm, the car was extensively raced in North America and won the 1963 Bahamas Speed Week

References

External links 
 Dead link
 Lola Mk6 GT - Ford on www.ultimatecarpage.com
 Lola Mk6 GT - Chevrolet on www.ultimatecarpage.com
 

Mk6
24 Hours of Le Mans race cars